Dennis James Saunders (born January 4, 1949) is a retired American professional baseball player, a right-handed pitcher who worked in eight Major League games for the 1970 Detroit Tigers, strictly in relief.

Saunders allowed 16 hits, five bases on balls and one home run — with eight strikeouts — in 14 innings pitched for Detroit. In his finest performance, his second Major League game on May 24, he relieved starter Mickey Lolich in the third inning and hurled 5⅔ innings of scoreless ball, allowing only three hits, against the Washington Senators.  He earned his only Major League save (on May 29) and victory (on June 10) against the Milwaukee Brewers.

His professional career concluded after the 1972 season, his sixth year in minor league baseball, where he appeared in 142 games, 63 as a starting pitcher.

References

External links

1949 births
Living people
Baseball players from California
Detroit Tigers players
Lakeland Tigers players
Major League Baseball pitchers
Memphis Blues players
Montgomery Rebels players
Rocky Mount Leafs players
Statesville Tigers players
Sportspeople from Alhambra, California
Tacoma Twins players
Tidewater Tides players
Toledo Mud Hens players